Blenkinsop is a surname of British origin. Notable people with the surname include:

Arthur Blenkinsop, (1911–1979), British Labour Party politician and MP
Christopher Blenkinsop (born 1963), Anglo-German musician
Ernie Blenkinsop (1902–1962), English football (soccer) player
Euphemia Blenkinsop (1816-1887), Irish-American religious sister
George Blenkinsop (1822–1904), pioneer in British Columbia, Canada
John Blenkinsop  (1783–1831), mining engineer and an inventor
Joseph Blenkinsopp (1927-2022) British-American theologian and Old Testament scholar
Layton Blenkinsop (1862–1942), British Army officer and veterinary surgeon
Tom Blenkinsop (born 1980), British politician
Tommy Blenkinsopp (1920–2004), English footballer
Yvonne Blenkinsop (1938-2022), British safety campaigner

Fictional characters:
Bertie Blenkinsop, character in The Beano comic, one of the softies and enemy of Dennis the Menace.

See also
Blenkinsop Castle
Blenkinsop Hall